Traditional Sunni and Shia Islamic marital jurisprudence allows Muslim men to be married to multiple women (a practice known as polygyny).

Scriptural basis

The verse most commonly referred to with the topic of polygamy is Verse 3 of Surah 4 An-Nisa (Women). A translation by Yusuf Ali is shown below:

It is believed these Verses were revealed after the Battle of Uhud, in which many Muslim men were killed, leaving widows and orphans. Thus, many argue that these Verses have been revealed "because of Allah's concern for the welfare of women and orphans who were left without husbands and fathers who died fighting for the Prophet and for Islam. It is a verse about compassion towards women and their children; it is not about men or their sexuality."

In the second part of Verse 4:3, the Qu’ran states "but if ye fear that ye shall not be able to deal justly (with them), then only one, or (a captive) that your right hands possess, that will be more suitable, to prevent you from doing injustice." If a man cannot deal justly with more than one wife, then he must marry only one. It is clear that this quote was revealed out of compassion towards women, and not as a means to please male sexuality, which is a common modern interpretation of such verses.

Putting the verses regarding polygyny into the broader Qur'anic context by examining the nature of marriage in Islam helps understanding them. The Quran [4:21- "And how could ye take it when ye have gone in unto each other, and they have Taken from you a solemn covenant?"] refers to marriage as a mithaq, i.e. a solemn covenant or agreement between husband and wife, and enjoins that it be put down in writing (4:21). Marriage is more than just a "solemn covenant" however, with Surah 30 verse 21 stating "And among His Signs is this, that He created for you mates from among yourselves, that ye may dwell in tranquillity with them, and He has put love and mercy between your (hearts): verily in that are Signs for those who reflect." Love and mercy are very much a part of marriage as described in the Qur'an. Although the Qur'an may prescribe different roles for males (husbands often seen as the provider), the equality between husband and wife is promoted when it is dictated in Surah 2 verse 187 that "They (your wives) are as a garment to you, and you are as a garment to them."

Opinions of classical Islamic scholars

Whilst traditional Islamic scholarship upholds the notion that Islamic law permits polygyny and furthermore enforces the divine command to "marry only one" where the man fears being unable to fulfil the rights of two in a fair manner, a substantial segment of the Islamic scholarship elaborates further on the ruling regarding men who are able to ensure complete equality amongst the multiple wives.

Their opinion was derived from performing ijtihad (independent legal reasoning) which determined their belief that it is to be deemed preferable (even for the male individual who is capable of delivering justice to the multiple families) to refrain from joining more than one wife in the marital bond.

This opinion has been codified into the official positions of the Hanbali and Shaafi’i schools of jurisprudence which assert that it is held recommended for a Muslim male to have only one wife, even if he may act equitably with more than one woman.

Ash-Shirbeeni from the Shaafi’i School of jurisprudence, said: "It is a Sunnah not to marry more than one wife if there is no apparent need." [Mughni al-Muhtaj 4/207].

Al-Maawardi, from the Shaafi’i School of jurisprudence, said: "Allaah has permitted a man to marry up to four wives, saying: {…two or three or four…}, but Allah advised that it is desirable for man to marry only one wife, saying: {…But if you fear that you will not be just, then [marry only] one}" [al-Hawi al-Kabir 11/417].

Ibn Qudaamah from the Hanbali School of jurisprudence, said in Ash-Sharh Al-Kabeer: "It is more appropriate to marry only one wife. The author of Al-Muharrar [i.e. Abul Barakaat Al-Majd ibn Taymiyyah] said this, based on the saying of Allaah (which means) {…But if you fear that you will not be just, then [marry only] one}." [Ash-Sharh Al-Kabeer authored by Shams-ud-deen Ibn Qudaamah].

Imam Ahmed ibn Naqib al Masri, from the Shaafi’i School of jurisprudence, said ‘’It is fitter to confine oneself to just one’’ [Umdatu Salik].

Imam Ghazali, from the Shaafi’i School of jurisprudence, stated: "It does not call for two wives, [since] plurality may render life miserable and disrupt the affairs of the home." [Kitab al Nikah, Ihya Uloom ud Din].

Imam Shaafi’i offered an additional exegesis for the final clause of the pivotal verse discussing the divine legislation of polygyny and the divine limitations imposed upon this ancient institution.
He espoused that the closing clause of verse 4:3,  usually interpreted as ‘that is more suitable that you may not incline to injustice’ should be understood as ‘that is more suitable that you may not be financially strained by numerous children’.

Imam Shaafi’i reasoned that divine decree had already listed fear of committing injustice as a reason to not wed more than once, hence it was pointless for the same reason (for not wedding more than once) to be expounded twice in the same verse.

His alternative interpretation pursued the perception which held that the presence of a plurality of women in a man's conjugal life would produce undesirably large numbers of offspring, which could be a potential cause of financial hardship and poverty in the future.

Given the emphasis that Islamic law stipulates on the welfare of children and nurturing children with permitted means of income, Imam Shaafi’i opined that it was legislated for a man to marry just once as an increase in the population of a family due to multiple marriages could potentially harbour harmful monetary consequences for the man who marries more than once.

Ash-Shaafi’i is of the view that it is desirable to confine oneself to marrying only one although it is permissible for him to marry more than one. This is to avoid being unfair by being more inclined to some of them than others, or being unable to financially support them. [al-Hawi al-Kabir 11/417].

Pre-Islamic (jahiliyya) context 

Prior to the emergence of Islam, the Arabian Peninsula was characterized by a wide range of marriage practices—both polygynous and polyandrous alike, as well as monogamous. As Leila Ahmed states in her work, Women and Gender in Islam, "evidence suggests that among the types of marriage practiced was matrilineal, uxorilocal marriage, found in Arabia, including Mecca, about the time of the birth of Muhammad (circa 570)--the woman remaining with her tribe, where the man could visit or reside with her, and the children belonging to the mother's tribe--as well as polyandrous and polygamous marriages." Thus, it is widely accepted that polygyny was not the only type of matrimony practiced during the jahiliyya (pre-Islamic era), but one part of a highly variegated and diverse pool of matrimony types.

Noteworthy was the fact that it was customary for men to marry women without limit, a practice that ended with the advent of the Qur'an and its divine revelation. It was common in jahiliyya Arabia for there to be no restriction on the number of wives a man could have. Often, tribal leadership tended toward polygynous marriages with the express purpose of establishing relationships with other powerful families, effectively injecting the practice of marriage with a political purpose. Further, it is important to note that marriages in this era, including polygynous ones, were not sacramental in nature, but purely contractual. It was not until Islam, one could say, standardized marriage and therefore what it constituted, that matrimony assumed a different set of characteristics beyond those of the purely contractual.

To amplify the context within which polygyny occupies an Islamic relevance, one should look to the current debates surrounding polygyny in Islam, and more broadly, polygamy, and the implications that emerged from their contextual transition from the jahiliyya to the Islamic era. Two highly dichotomous views on the social significance of the institutionalization of polygyny by Islam are provided by Leila Ahmed and Asghar Ali Engineer, and their views differ on the question of women. How did the establishment of polygyny in Islam as the only alternative to monogamy change the social condition of women? One verse that is often cited in these arguments is that which was quoted earlier — verse 3 of Surah 4.

Some, like Ali, argue that the overall condition of women who lived in the jahiliyya improved with the advent of Islam. These scholars cite a general establishment of order and protection provided by the Qur'anic verses, espousing the view that "the position of women was ameliorated to a greater degree by the mission of Muhammad." Nefarious practices of infanticide-particularly that of female newborns-capricious divorces, and unlimited license of polygyny all were social phenomena eradicated by the revelation of Qur'anic verses relating to the question of polygyny. Moulavi Chiragh Ali summarizes this view, stating, "The Qur’an gradually improved and elevated the degraded condition of women [in the jahiliyya] by curtailing, in the first place, the unlimited number of wives to four...and, in the second place, declaring it impossible to deal equitably with more than one wife even if men ‘would fain to do so,’ and thus virtually abolishing polygamy." Conversely, those of Ahmed's perspective would argue that with the arrival of Qur’anic law came the loss of sexual autonomy for women. In this view, jahiliyya marriage practices, including that of pre-Islamic polygyny, correlated with women's being "active participants, even leaders, in a wide range of community activities...their autonomy and participation were curtailed with the establishment of Islam, its institution of patrilineal, patriarchal marriage as solely legitimiate, and the social transformation that ensued." An extended discussion of the intersection of feminism and polygyny can be found in later sections of this article; see Muslim Feminism and Polygyny.

Modern interpretations and practice 

Most modern Muslims view the practice of polygyny as allowed, but unusual and not recommended. The practice of polygyny is often viewed in its historical context, as the marriage was the only way for a woman to be provided for during the time of Muhammad.  Many countries today either outlaw the practice of polygyny or place restrictions on it.

Several countries, such as Libya, allow polygyny with few or no restrictions.

In Indonesia, a majority-Muslim secular nation, polygyny is rare. In 2018, it was practiced by approximately 1% of the population.

Polygamy has always been rare among South Asian Muslims. In medieval India and Punjab, most ordinary Muslim men only had one wife. Polygamy was rare outside the wealthy class, unless in case of infertility of the first wife. It was rare for a lower or middle class woman to have a rival.

Most men in the Ottoman Empire were monogamous while only a small minority were polygamous. Salomon Schweigger who travelled in the Ottoman Empire wrote in the late 16th century that polygamy was absent. In the 1700s wealthy families in Istanbul looked down on elite men who married more than once. High level officials were required to leave their wives and concubines if they were to marry an Ottoman princess. Lady Mary Wortley Montagu visited the Ottoman Empire in 1717 and noticed that while Muslims were allowed four wives no "man of quality" used this right. Of all the top Ottoman men at court, the author only found one who had female slaves.

Countries that ban polygyny 

Turkey was the first Muslim-majority country to legally ban polygyny in 1926. This decision was not based on religious reasons, but rather was an entirely secular ban. Tunisia was the next country to ban polygyny through legislation passed in 1956 and restated in 1964. Unlike Turkey, Tunisia banned polygyny on religious grounds, citing two main reasons. First, the Quran limited the practice of polygyny, thus it did not support the practice and clearly intended for the practice to be eliminated over time. Second, the Quran demands equal treatment of all wives in a polygynous marriage, which was deemed impossible, thus making the practice illegal. Finally, Israel banned polygyny as well by 1978.

Countries that restrict polygyny 

The following countries restrict the practice of polygyny:
 Egypt (1920) 
 Sudan (1929)
 India (1939)
 Algeria
 Jordan (1951)
 Syria (1953)
 Morocco (1958)
 Bangladesh
 Iraq (1959)
 Iran (1967, 1975)
 Kuwait
 Lebanon

Some countries, including India, Iran, Iraq, Bangladesh, Algeria, Lebanon, Morocco, Jordan, and Kuwait, allow women to include a clause prohibiting polygyny in marriage contracts. Other countries, such as Iran and Pakistan, require that a man get permission to take a second wife from his first wife, and then show the court proof of his first wife's consent. Finally, countries such as Malaysia state that a man must get permission from both his wife and from the governmental religious authority in order to take a second.

Although many countries have laws restricting or banning polygyny, it is still practiced illegally. It is difficult to enforce anti-polygyny laws and restrictions in countries with large rural populations. Furthermore, illegal polygyny often occurs in countries with poor social services as women rely on husbands to support them in these situations.

One way that polygyny is still legally practiced in Iran today is through the practice of mut'a, a temporary contractual relationship based on the mutual consent of a man and a woman. Throughout the contracted time, the woman must remain exclusively faithful to the man, and in return he must provide for her financially. Although this practice is technically legal, it is very highly disputed.

Muslim feminism and polygyny

Emergence of feminism 
Muslim feminism is a fairly new movement, even though women's rights issues have been at the forefront of social reform for a while.
This began to change when Muslim women realized they could alter their roles in society by rereading the main religious texts that dictated Muslim society and ethics.  This return to reinterpretation was not a new practice – male Islamic scholars had been doing it ever since Muhammad's death – but for women, it was unprecedented: this was the first time that women were learning how to read and study the Qur'an and the hadiths in an analytical way.  Their new religious knowledge led them to a better understanding of their faith, as well as the ability to make educated interpretations of the texts.  Many of these Islamic feminist scholars began to realize that there was no inherent tie between Islam and the patriarchal practices of Islamic society.  For example, these feminists studied Muhammad's life and argued that he treated women very progressively for that era. Muhammad included all of his wives in his religious practices and respected them enough to take their advice and grievances seriously.  They also even accompanied him to battle. According to Muslim feminists, Islamic polygyny was meant to curtail the practice that was already widespread in pre-Islamic times.  Conquering rulers would collect massive harems of women and treat them without any respect; whereas Islam reduced the allowable amount of wives each husband could have and required that he treat them all equally. These feminists place emphasis on the idea that only those men who are capable of loving and financially providing for each wife equally are permitted to have more than one.  They also point out the practice of polygyny in Islam was created for the purpose of taking care of fatherless children, or orphans. Thus, polygyny was allowable for charitable and honorable purposes.  Islamic feminists point out that "a recognition that gender inequality in the old world was assumed and that perceptions of women in Christian and Jewish texts are not that different from those of Islamic texts" is lacking from common understandings of Islam.

Two leading feminist Muslim scholars who are seeking to increase women's rights through the reinterpretation of religious texts are Amina Wadud and Asma Barlas.  Both women embrace Islam as a religion that preaches gender equality.  They see societal practices, not Islam, as the main problem.  Wadud points out the three reasons that the Qur'an views as acceptable forms of polygyny: if the husband is not sexually satisfied he may take another wife rather than turn to prostitutes or an affair, if the first wife is unable to reproduce or another woman with child needs to be taken care of, and/or if the husband is financially stable enough to care for another woman in the Muslim community. According to Wadud, the form of polygyny that the Qur'an supports focuses on "justice: dealing justly, managing funds justly, justice to the orphans, and justice to the wives." Barlas, who published her theological research several years later, argues a very similar point.  Both feminist scholars point out the origin of the Islamic theory of polygyny in Ayah 4:3.  This verse of the Qur'an was not meant to utilize polygyny as a way to oppress women, but to ensure that they were taken care of.

The other form of feminism in the Islamic world is independent or state feminism.  The premise behind this movement is that "no reform is possible in an Islamic legal and political system where ‘the very structure of power is male dominated to an absolute degree, back by the Constitution, an all-male clerical system ruling the country.’" They also point out that Islam supports and perpetuates a clear female role that designates women to the margins of society. These Muslim feminists argue that there is only so much that reinterpreting the texts can do and believe that the best – and perhaps only – way to increasing women's rights is outside of the parameters of Islam. Therefore, changing polygynist practices would involve reforming the political and legal systems instead of just trying to reinterpret the Qur’an and the hadiths to determine if they really support the practice and to what extent.

Women's movements and family law reforms in the Middle East
Feminism's effect on polygyny in Islam is different in every Muslim society, depending on the different cultures that are interacting with Islam in each location.  For example, in Iran, changes to women's rights occurred in the wake of the Islamic Revolution in 1979.  During this revolution the Family Protection Law, which had given some power to women and imposed minimal restrictions on polygyny, was overturned.  Muslim women were encouraged to return to their traditional roles.  This loss of rights led to the movement realizing that they could not necessarily rely on the government alone to protect their rights.  This spurred the creation of the personal status laws, which covered many issues relating to marriage and divorce including polygyny. Passed in 1986, the law "effectively reinstates the provision of the 1975 Family Protection Law granting a wife the right to obtain a divorce if her husband marries a second woman without the wife's permission of if…a man does not treat his wives fairly and equally." This offers Iranian Muslim women some legal protection against polygyny, but the enforcement of the law is still up to the interpretation of the courts.  Muslim women's movement organizations have begun to gain more power in Iran due to the increasing number of Muslim women who are studying the Qur'an analytically.  These new scholars are able to argue for interpretations of Islam that empower rather than oppress women.  They also lead organizations like the Association of Muslim Women and Zeynab.  Many Muslim women also go jalasehs where they can openly discuss religious texts in a safe environment. 

Egypt, Jordan, and Morocco also began restricting polygynous practices in Islam.  Egypt's personal status laws underwent many changes between 1979 and 1985, but in the end they were very restrictive for women and reduced the limits on polygyny. This incentivized Egyptian feminists to create a new marriage contract (approved in 2000) that would give women some rights concerning divorce and what was allowable in marriage. Jordan was able to have more success in 2001 when it amended its Civil Status Law, which requires the consent of the wife before the husband marries again. This change was accompanied by a handful of other progressive decisions on women's rights in the country, greatly improving the status of women.  Morocco was also pushed along by its Muslim feminist groups to make entering into a polygynous marriage more difficult.

Muslim feminism in Asia 
Islamic communities in Asia, such as Indonesia and Malaysia, have also experienced feminist movements which work to restrict polygynous practices.  Indonesian feminists have challenged these practices through the study and reinterpretation of religious texts.  Fatayat NU, a voluntary Muslim women's organization, was created in 1950 for middle-aged women who were a part of Nahdlatul Ulama, a Sunni Islam group, and wanted to have a voice. Initially experiencing membership issues due to large percentage of women who were married or uneducated, Fatayat NU began to gain power as institutions outside of Indonesia took notice of it and supported the organizations work. The women in Fatayat NU use Islam and the religious texts to justify their actions and guide their decisions, so women who have extensively studied the religion are crucial.  Out of the many controversial issues that Fatayat NU takes a stand on, polygyny is one that has recently come into contention.  Although polygyny in Indonesia was never very popular, some Muslim women are worried that it is starting to gain more support.  Nahdlatul Ulama is one of the organizations that approves of polygyny as an Islamic practice, but Fatayat NU is taking a contradicting stance; the members believe that polygyny can only be possible if men and women are unequal, which goes against their interpretation of the Qur'an's message on gender status.

In Malaysia, polygyny has been considered a topic that is not fit to be brought up in public, but recently it has begun to enter public discourse.  This change came about through the passage of a new Islamic family law, which supports polygynous practices by making them easier for men to take part in.  This has created a "debate between Islamic fundamentalists who dominate the burgeoning Islamic Affairs Department that administers Shariah law and mostly Western-educated Muslim feminists who say the department, in its overzealous interpretation of the Qur’an, has gone overboard in making new laws that discriminate against women and children." The campaign against this law was very popular, but the law was still passed.  Muslim women's organizations in Malaysia plan to continue protesting it until it is revoked.

Polygyny in Islamic popular culture

Literature 

Polygyny has appeared in literature in many different Islamic societies.  Indian Muslim literature has traditionally stood divided on its position on polygyny as a justifiable practice.  Two Indian authors, Akbari Begum and Bashiruddin Ahmad, revealed in their novels a belief that polygyny is acceptable in certain circumstances; whereas Nazr Sajjad Hyder opposed this notion and completely rejected the practice in her work.  Gudar ka Lal (The Ruby in Rags), written in 1907 by Akbari Begum, projected the author's beliefs on a wide range of subjects involving the treatment of Muslim women and girls, including polygyny.  The story's plotline revolves around the relationships between Yusuf Raza and his two wives, Maqbool and Mehr Jabeen.  Yusuf Raza remarries when he realizes that his first wife is so uneducated that she does not know how to properly take care of her children or the household.  At first, Maqbool is resentful of Mehr Jabeen, but eventually she recognizes Mehr Jabeen's kind and friendly nature, and the two become friends.  This happy outcome reflects Begum's belief that polygyny in Islam can be justified when marriages are seen as incompatible and could benefit from a second wife who could help around the house and thus ease tensions.  Bashiruddin Ahmad's novel, Iqbal Dulham (The Bride Iqbal), also promotes the ideal polygynous relationship where the wives become friends and find vital companionship instead of competition.  Published in 1908, Iqbal Dulham follows a young man, Iqbal Mirza, who marries a second wife after his first wife fails to conceive children.  The initial tension between the wives is relieved when the second wife gives birth.  Once Iqbal Mirza has children, his relationship with his first wife improves, and the two wives are then able to become friends.  Thus, Ahmad portrays how polygyny can be used to ease the pressure on the first wife to produce children. In both stories polygyny is a solution to domestic disharmony.

Nazr Sajjad Hyder, however, shows her disproval of the practice of polygyny in Ah-e Mazluman (Sighs of the Oppressed), written around 1912.  The two households in Ah-e Mazluman, both engage in polygynous practices, but Hyder presents the relationships between husband and wives as very negatively affected; the stories "accentuate the cruelty of husbands towards their wives and aim to intensify the exclusion and alienation experienced by the first wife." Hyder perceives polygyny as a practice that is harming Islam and giving it a bad reputation. She recommends its end and pleads that Muslim men act in a more just manner towards their women.

The complexity of Islamic polygyny is also revealed in Assia Djebar's Ombre sultane (Shadow sultana).  Written in Algeria in 1987, it is told from the perspective of the first wife, Isma.  She thus constructs through her descriptions how the reader perceives the second wife and the husband.  The second wife, Hajila, is seen as a rival and is reduced through Isma's portrayals to body parts that are disassociated from Hajila as a whole person.  This reveals Isma's lack of respect for Hajila and the process of "othering" that Isma uses to degrade Hajila. Hence, the idea that polygyny creates a sense of solidarity between wives is shown to be flawed. Isma also describes Hajila in unflattering terms that distance her from the attentions of the husband they share and of other men. This is in contrast to Isma's depiction of herself as constantly being the object of male desire, creating a sense that sisterhood between the two women is out of the question.  However, Isma's diction also creates a relationship between herself and Hajila in which neither can exist without the other; "they are locked in a sorority created, in a way, in tandem with the patriarchal force that remains a threat to their very existence." Therefore, Djebar's portrayal of polygyny is multifaceted and conflicting: it has the ability to create both rivalry and solidarity.

Music 

Polygyny in Islam has surfaced in music around the world and across the decades.  For instance, in Malaysia in the 1950s and 60s, the famous entertainer P. Ramlee dealt with many sociopolitical issues in his art.  Whereas the rest of the music industry was under the outside influence of Latin America, India, and the United States, Ramlee's music was inspired by what was going on in Malaysian society.  He critiqued the practice of polygyny to keep in line with his self-proclaimed role of exposing the weaknesses of his society. These socially critical songs did not necessarily fit into the categories of popular music at the time, but they were still embraced by his audiences.

Hip hop has become increasingly popular across the world, and Islam has had a significant influence in rap music in the United States where hip hop first emerged. Two Muslim hip hop artists who bring up the concept of polygyny in their music are Miss Undastood and Sons of Hagar.  "Miss Undastood, a young veiled, African-American lyricist, raps on her CD Dunya or Deen (Life or Faith) about war, love, the challenges of being a young Muslim woman in America, and the power of faith." Sons of Hagar is another hip hop group that seeks to positively portray Islam in their lyrics and support Islamic practices in their actions.  Their song, "Sisterssss," supports polygynous practices.  The members of the group rationalize that even though polygyny is illegal in America, rapping about it is much less offensive than when other artists rap about prostitutes.

Film 

Islamic polygyny has also appeared as a controversial issue in films.  For example, Ayat-ayat Cinta (Verses of Love) was released in Indonesia in 2008.  This movie follows the life of Fahri bin Abdillah, a student in Egypt, and his relationships with four women.  The film inspired more open, public discussion on polygyny in Indonesia by calling attention to the conditions of women who enter into polygynous relationships. Another Indonesian movie that tackles the subject of polygyny is Berbagi Suami (Husband for Share), which came out in 2006.  The director, Nia Dinata, was inspired by her experiences in Indonesia with women who were in polygynous relationships. She acknowledges that every woman reacted in different ways to their marriage but ultimately all felt isolated and saddened by the addition of a new wife. Three stories are told within the movie and all three leading actresses learn to at least outwardly accept their situations, whether they are the first wife finding about the existence of other women or the new addition to the family who has to situate herself in the household hierarchy.

Television

The Philippine television series, Legal Wives, focuses on a Muslim man marrying three women. It is noted as the first Islam-oriented television series in the country.

See also

 Cousin marriage in the Middle East
 Islamic sexual jurisprudence
 Islamic views on slavery
 Mormonism and Islam
 Nikah Misyar
 Obedient Wives Club
 Rape in Islamic law
 Rights and obligations of spouses in Islam
 Sex segregation and Islam
 History of concubinage in the Muslim world
 Waithood
 What your right hands possess
 Widow inheritance

References

External links

QuranicPath | Polygamy - To Mothers of Orphans Only

Marriage in Islam
Polygyny